Illuminati is a card game made by Steve Jackson Games (SJG), inspired by the 1975 book, The Illuminatus! Trilogy, by Robert Anton Wilson and Robert Shea. The game has ominous secret societies competing with each other to control the world through various means, including legal, illegal, and even mystical.  It was designed as a "tongue-in-cheek rather than serious" take on conspiracy theories. It contains groups named similarly to real world organizations, such as the Society for Creative Anachronism and the Symbionese Liberation Army.  It can be played by two to eight players. Depending on the number of players, a game can take between one and six hours.

Genesis of game
In September 1981, Steve Jackson and his regular freelance cover artist Dave Martin discussed their shared admiration of the Illuminatus! Trilogy, and the latter suggested a game. Steve Jackson decided against adapting the novel because of the expense of game rights, and the difficulty of adapting a novel with such convoluted plots. He decided "a game about the secret-conspiracy idea behind Illuminatus!" was viable. After researching the Illuminati and conspiracy theories, and "extensive and enthusiastic playtesting" it went on the market in July 1982 in the (at the time) usual SJG Pocket Box format.  Over the next few years, three expansions for the Pocket Box Illuminati game were published.  The first two were substantially incorporated into the deluxe edition, while the third was a version of what would become Illuminati: Brainwash.

Robert Shea provided a four-paragraph introduction to the rulebook for the Illuminati Expansion Set 1 (1983), in which he wrote, "Maybe the Illuminati are behind this game. They must be—they are, by definition, behind everything."

In 2001, although Illuminatus! Trilogy co-author Robert Anton Wilson did not specifically name Illuminati, he criticized some products for exploiting the Illuminatus! name without paying royalties by taking advantage of legal loopholes.  Later commentators have attributed both the game and the Illuminatus! Trilogy as using real conspiracies as "targets of ridicule."

Description

The game is played with a deck of special cards, money chips (representing "millions of dollars in low-denomination unmarked banknotes") and two six-sided dice. There are three types of cards:

 Illuminati
 Groups
 Special cards

The players take role of Illuminati societies that struggle to take over the world.  The Pocket Box edition depicted six Illuminati groups: The Bavarian Illuminati, The Discordian Society, The UFOs, The Servants of Cthulhu, The Bermuda Triangle, and The Gnomes of Zürich. The deluxe edition added the Society of Assassins and The Network, and the Illuminati Y2K expansion added the Church of The SubGenius and Shangri-La. The aim of the game is fulfilled when Illuminati build a power structure consisting of given number of cards (dependent on number of players), or when Illuminati fulfill its special goal, (such as controlling at least one card of each alignment for the Bermuda Triangle).

The world is represented by group cards such as Secret Masters of Fandom, the CIA, The International Communist Conspiracy, Evil Geniuses for a Better Tomorrow, California, and many more – there are over 300 official cards available. Every group and Illuminati has some Power, Resistance and Income values; most of the world groups have an Alignment. The game is written with the usual SJG humor. The game uses a multitude of conspiracy theory in-jokes, with cards such as the Boy Sprouts (where sinister youth leaders influence the world leaders of tomorrow), the Orbital Mind Control Lasers, the Mafia, two headed Anti-Nuclear Activists, or Trekkies.  Special cards represent unexpected phenomena and features, for example increasing Income or Resistance of a group.

The game is played in turns. The primary Illuminati (player) activity is taking control of groups. Other types of attacks are attacks to neutralize (removing from Illuminati power structure and returning to the table - to the world) and attack to destroy (removing from the game).  Besides attacking groups the players can trade, form alliances, and many other activities. Tactics such as playing opponents off each other, backstabbing and concealing your true motives are encouraged in this game.  In one variant of the game, players are allowed to cheat, steal money from the table and do anything it takes to win.

During an attack to take control, the attacker must overcome the Resistance of attacked groups with combined Power of his groups (affected by Alignment of attacker and attacked), money spent, and influence of special cards. The attacked group can be defended by spending money and special cards by other players (especially by a controlling Illuminati). After a successful attack to take control, the card is placed (along the special markers) next to Illuminati, or another already controlled group forming a power structure.

Each group has its own money, marked by money counters on that group. Most groups have an income collected at the beginning of each turn; money can also be moved one step at a time between groups once per turn. Money in the Illuminated group is accessible for defense of or attacks on all groups in the entire world. Money in the groups can only be used by that group, but gives double defense bonus when spent in defense.

Although the game can support two to ten players, a group of four or five is considered ideal. Some Illuminati might seem unbalanced, such as the high-income Gnomes and the low-level Discordians, but sometimes their true value is not visible at first or valuable only in certain circumstances. Planning the power structure is important, since groups close to the Illuminated core have a defense bonus. Also, groups can "block" each other's control arrows, through which groups control other groups. The flow of money is important, as a large lump of it will boost the offense / defense of the owning group.

The game has attained cult status in some circles, been referenced in some geek media (like User Friendly comic strip). It is also mentioned in Dan Brown's novel Angels & Demons, which concerns an apparent attack by the revived Illuminati; the game is referred to as an online computer game, but references to Steve Jackson make clear that the reference is to this game.

Expansions
Available expansion sets are:
Illuminati Mutual Assured Distraction (2010);
Illuminati Bavarian Fire Drill (2007);
Illuminati Y2K (1999);
Illuminati Brainwash (1985).

Related games

Steve Jackson Games also released a collectible card game version called Illuminati: New World Order and a stand-alone version called Illuminati: Crime Lords. SJG also developed some Illuminated role-playing game modules for its GURPS system, including GURPS Illuminati, GURPS Illuminati University and GURPS Warehouse 23.

SJG also released two related games. One is the recent Illuminati: Crime Lords where the players control mobs in attempt to take over a city. This is a separate game based on a similar rules set. The other one is Hacker which is also similar to the original Illuminati (modulo terminology), but the players fight for the control of computer networks. It is more loose, and based primarily on interlocking access to different computer systems in the web. Players are not set directly towards each other, and several players can share access to a system.

Adventure Systems created a Play-by-mail game (PBM) Illuminati game, based on and licensed from the Steve Jackson game, with many modifications. The game was eventually purchased, and is now run, by Flying Buffalo. The designer, Draper Kauffman, had been trying to develop a "global strategy game" for many years when he received a copy of Illuminati.  Recalling the creation of the PBM version, Kauffman wrote, "It wasn't long before I found that every problem in my own game design had a suspiciously similar solution: 'Hey, how about if we just handle that like they did in Illuminati?"

Reception
Phil Masters reviewed Illuminati for White Dwarf #40, giving it an overall rating of 7 out of 10, and stated that "Overall, this is a playable game with a good element of skill; it creates an appropriate atmosphere of conspiracy and cynicism, although the open hands system rather removes the element of paranoid secrecy inherent in conspiracy theories. Illuminati will earn its devotees, especially in America, although it lacks the elegance of the best cult games."

Phil Masters reviewed Illuminati Expansion Sets 1 & 2 for White Dwarf #44, giving it an overall rating of 6 out of 10, and stated that "the concept is certain to appeal to anyone with a pet dislike or a shred of cheap cynicism."

In the December 1983 edition of Dragon, Michael Lowrey believed that Steve Jackson Games had "a definite potential classic here, and one which, properly marketed, could appeal to folks who will never play a wargame in their lives". However Lowrey thought the two expansion sets were overly expensive, and advised consumers to see how they liked the basic game before buying the expansion sets.  

In Space Gamer No. 68, Dave Nalle concurred about the first two expansion sets: "These are excellent but high-priced expansions to a good and popular game. Before buying them and shelling out [the cash], you will probably want to pause to consider how much you will be using them, and as long as you play fairly frequently, the price may be worth the use you'll get."

Several issues later, in The Space Gamer No. 76, Kevin Ross gave the Illuminati Expansion Set 3 a positive review, saying, "If you want some great new wrinkles for your Illuminati game, you definitely need this supplement. The rules make for a longer but much more enjoyable game. And don't let the lack of a Pocket Box or the thinness of the package fool you. There's a lot here for [the price]." 

In the December 1993 edition of Dragon (Issue 200), Allen Varney called it "a brilliant card-and-token game." He concluded, "Ingenious and satirical,
the Illuminati game fosters good-humored paranoia and dramatic struggles."

In 2007, almost 25 years after its original publication, Illuminati was chosen for the book Hobby Games: The 100 Best. Scott Haring wrote that Illuminati is "too much fun and has too much replay value to fade away on its own. Indeed, 25 years after its initial release, Illuminati is still immensely popular, having spawned multiple editions, three expansion sets, Steve Jackson Games' corporate logo, a spinoff collectible card game that is still the single biggest-selling product line in SJ Games history, and — my favorite — a complete set of color-coded pins that identified Illuminati members and their specialty."

Awards
 Illuminati won the Origins Award for Best Science Fiction Boardgame of 1982.
 GURPS Illuminati won the Origins Award for Best Roleplaying Supplement of 1992.
 Illuminati: New World Order won the Origins Award for Best Card Game of 1994.
 Illuminati PBM won the Origins Award for Best Play-by-Mail Game of 1985, 1990–1994, tied in 1995 with Middle-Earth Play-By-Mail, and was then added to their Hall of Fame in 1997.

Reviews
Asimov's Science Fiction v7 n12 (1983 12)
Jeux & Stratégie nouvelle formule #3

References

 
 
 Award Winners - Origins International Game Expo

External links
 The official Illuminati game home page
 The official Illuminati PBM game home page 
  

Card games introduced in 1982
Dedicated deck card games
Steve Jackson (American game designer) games
Origins Award winners
Multiplayer games
Steve Jackson Games games
Works about conspiracy theories
Works about the Illuminati